Bombay Dockyard, also known as Naval Dockyard, is an Indian shipbuilding yard at Mumbai. The superintendent of the dockyard is a Naval Officer of the rank Rear Admiral, known as the Admiral Superintendent.

Background

Shipbuilding was an established profession throughout the Indian coastline prior to the advent of the Europeans and it contributed significantly to maritime exploration throughout Indian maritime history. Indian rulers weakened with the advent of the European powers during the middle ages. Indian shipbuilders, however, continued to build ships capable of carrying 800 to 1000 tons. The shipbuilders built ships like HMS Hindostan and HMS Ceylon, inducted into the Royal Navy. Other historical ships made by the Indian shipbuilders included HMS Asia (commanded by Edward Codrington during the Battle of Navarino in 1827), HMS Cornwallis (on board which the Treaty of Nanking was signed in 1842), and HMS Minden (on which Francis Scott Key wrote the poem "The Defence of Fort McHenry", later to become the lyrics to "The Star-Spangled Banner").

History

The Yard was established in 1735 by the East India Company, which brought in shipwrights from their base at Surat in order to construct vessels using Malabar teak. One of their number, Lovji Nusserwanjee Wadia, was (along with several generations of his descendants) a key figure in the success of the Yard, as indicated in The New Cambridge History of India: Science, Technology and Medicine in Colonial India:

Lowji Wadia oversaw the building of Bombay Dock, Asia's first dry dock, in 1750; it is still in use today. A contemporary British traveller, Abraham Parsons, described it as follows in 1775:

In 1811 the British Royal Navy took over the Yard, continuing to work with the Wadia family as Master Shipwrights. There was much construction on the site around this time. Duncan Dock, which was the largest dry dock outside Europe at the time, was constructed in 1807–1810, and remains in use today. The main Dockyard building, which fronts onto Shahid Bhagat Singh Road, dates from 1807, as does the administration block. The nearby Great Western Building (formerly Admiralty House) had housed the Port Admiral from around 1764–1792.

Today the Yard serves as the premier repair yard of the Indian Navy. It employs 10,000 workers (mostly civilians) overseen by an Admiral Superintendent.

References

Notes
 Arnold, David (2004), The New Cambridge History of India: Science, Technology and Medicine in Colonial India, Cambridge University Press, .

External links

 Bombay Dockyard / Naval Dockyard, Mumbai, GlobalSecurity.org.

Maritime history of India
Indian Navy
Shipyards of India
Buildings and structures in Mumbai
Naval Dockyard